NGC 167 is a spiral galaxy located approximately 172 million light-years from the Solar System in the constellation Cetus. It was discovered in 1886 by Francis Preserved Leavenworth.

See also 
 List of NGC objects (1–1000)

References

External links 
 
 SEDS

0167
2122
Cetus (constellation)
Spiral galaxies
Discoveries by Francis Leavenworth